The tennis competition at the 1999 Pan American Games was held from July 29 to August 5, 1999, at the Winnipeg Lawn Tennis Club in Winnipeg, Manitoba, Canada.  Men's and women's singles and doubles events were held.

Medal summary

Medal table

See also
Tennis at the Pan American Games

References
 Results

 
Pan American Games
Events at the 1999 Pan American Games
1999
Tennis tournaments in Canada